Edith Anne "Edie" Widder Smith (born 1951) is an American oceanographer, marine biologist, author and the Co-founder, CEO and Senior Scientist at the Ocean Research & Conservation Association.

Early life and education 
Widder was born in Arlington, Massachusetts to Dr. David Widder, a Harvard University mathematics professor, and Dr. Vera Widder, a mathematician turned stay at home mother.  She also had an older brother, David Charles Widder.

She graduated from Tufts University magna cum laude with a B.S. in Biology, from University of California, Santa Barbara with an M.S. in Biochemistry, and from University of California, Santa Barbara with a PhD in Neurobiology, in 1982.

Career 
Widder was a senior scientist and director of the Bioluminescence Department at the Harbor Branch Oceanographic Institution from 1989 to 2005.  Certified as a Scientific Research Pilot for Atmospheric Diving Systems in 1984, she holds certifications that qualify her to dive the deep diving suit WASP as well as the single-person untethered submersibles DEEP ROVER and DEEP WORKER and she has made over 250 dives in the JOHNSON SEA LINK submersibles.  Her research involving submersibles has been featured in BBC, PBS, Discovery Channel and National Geographic television productions.

A specialist in bioluminescence, she has been a leader in helping to design and invent new instrumentation and techniques that enable scientists to see the ocean in new ways.  These include HIDEX, a bathyphotometer, which is the U.S. Navy standard for measuring bioluminescence in the ocean, and a remotely operated camera system, known as Eye in the Sea (EITS), an unobtrusive deep-sea observatory.

In 2005, Widder co- founded the Ocean Research & Conservation Association (ORCA), a non-profit organization dedicated to the protection of aquatic ecosystems and the species they sustain through development of innovative technologies and science-based conservation action. While translating complex scientific issues into engineerable solutions, Widder is fostering greater understanding of ocean life as a means to better, more informed ocean stewardship. In September 2006 she was awarded a prestigious MacArthur Fellowship from the John D. and Catherine T. MacArthur Foundation and in 2010 she participated in the TED Mission Blue Voyage in the Galapagos.

In 2012, a team of scientists comprising Edith Widder, zoologist Tsunemi Kubodera and marine biologist Steve O'Shea successfully filmed a live giant squid (Architeuthis dux) in its natural habitat aboard Oceanx's MV Alucia.

In 2019, Edith Widder and Nathan J. Robinson filmed the first-ever footage of a live giant squid recorded in US waters. This expedition was aboard the R/V Point Sur of the University of Southern Mississippi.

Personal life 
Widder is married to David Smith, a computer engineer.

Awards 
 2006 MacArthur Fellows Program
 2015 Roy Chapman Andrews Society Distinguished Explorer Award
 2018 Explorers Club Citation of Merit
2019 Eleanor Fletcher Lifetime Achievement Award
 2020 Captain Don Walsh Award for Ocean Exploration established by the Marine Technology Society and the Society of Underwater Technology

Publications 
Selected publications include:
 
 
 
 
 
 
 
 
 
 
 Johnsen, S. and E.A. Widder.  (1999)  The physical basis of transparency in biological tissue: Ultrastructure and the minimization of light scattering.  J. Theor. Biol. 199: 181–198

Robinson, N.; Johnsen, S.; Brooks, A.; Frey, L.; Judkins, H.; Vecchione, M.; Widder, E. (2021). "Studying the swift, smart, and shy: Unobtrusive camera-platforms for observing large deep-sea squid."

Books 

 The Bioluminescence Coloring Book
 Below the Edge of Darkness: A Memoir of Exploring Light and Life in the Deep Sea

Further reading 
 
Season 5 – Episode 002 – Edith Widder - oceanographer, marine biologist, and Co-founder of Orca (podcast).
Wilson, Abigail. (2020). Edith Widder 1951-today. WomensActivism.NYC 
Futureproof with Jonathan McCrea (2020). Bioluminescence. (podcast).
Orca podcast (2019). Episode 1: A Q&A with ORCA founder, Senior Scientist, and CEO, Dr. Edie Widder (podcast). 
Ted Radio hour (2018). In Search of (podcast). 
Yale 360 Interview 2021. A Scientist Reveals the Bioluminescent Magic of the Deep-Sea World 
New York Times Book Review of Below the Edge of Darkness

References

External links 

 "Profile: Edith Widder", Science Now
 "Q&A: Edith Widder, MacArthur Fellow", Gulf of Maine Times, Lisa Capone, 2007
 Erik Olsen, "Illuminating the Perils of Pollution, Nature’s Way", New York Times, December 19, 2011.
 
 "Glowing life in an underwater world" (Mission Blue Voyage 2010)
 "The weird, wonderful world of bioluminescence" (TED2011)
 "How we found the giant squid" (TED2013)
 "Ocean Enlightenment: A conversation with Edie Widder", Ideas Roadshow, 2013

1951 births
Living people
American marine biologists
American oceanographers
Tufts University School of Arts and Sciences alumni
University of California, Santa Barbara alumni
MacArthur Fellows